The Central District of Sardasht County is in West Azerbaijan province, Iran. At the National Census in 2006, its population was 72,777 in 15,071 households. The following census in 2011 counted 80,550 people in 19,736 households. At the latest census in 2016, the district had 86,590 inhabitants in 22,964 households.

References 

Sardasht County

Districts of West Azerbaijan Province

Populated places in West Azerbaijan Province

Populated places in Sardasht County